Brannons Store (also known as Brannon) is a ghost town in Spartanburg County, in the U.S. state of South Carolina.  It was located between Inman and New Prospect.

History
A post office called Brannons was established in 1888, and remained in operation until 1902. J. A. Brannon, the local storekeeper and postmaster, gave the community his name.

References

Geography of Spartanburg County, South Carolina